Miguel Tavares Rodrigues (born 2 March 1993) is a Portuguese professional volleyball player. He is a member of the Portugal national team. At the professional club level, he plays for Aluron CMC Warta Zawiercie.

Honours

Clubs
 National championships
 2010/2011  Portuguese Cup, with Benfica Lisboa
 2011/2012  Portuguese SuperCup, with Benfica Lisboa
 2011/2012  Portuguese Cup, with Benfica Lisboa
 2012/2013  Portuguese SuperCup, with Benfica Lisboa
 2012/2013  Portuguese Championship, with Benfica Lisboa
 2013/2014  Portuguese SuperCup, with Benfica Lisboa
 2013/2014  Portuguese Championship, with Benfica Lisboa
 2017/2018  French Cup, with Tourcoing LM

Individual awards
 2018: French Championship – Best Setter
 2019: French Championship – Best Setter

References

External links

 
 Player profile at LegaVolley.it  
 Player profile at PlusLiga.pl  
 Player profile at Volleybox.net

1993 births
Living people
People from Amadora
Sportspeople from Lisbon District
Portuguese men's volleyball players
Portuguese expatriate sportspeople in Italy
Expatriate volleyball players in Italy
Portuguese expatriate sportspeople in France
Expatriate volleyball players in France
Portuguese expatriate sportspeople in Poland
Expatriate volleyball players in Poland
S.L. Benfica volleyball players
Cuprum Lubin players
Warta Zawiercie players
Setters (volleyball)